The Governor of Plymouth was the military Captain or Governor of the Fortress of Plymouth. The Governorship was abolished in 1842. The Lieutenant Governorship was vested in the General Officer Commanding Western District from 1793 to 1903, and in the Officer Commanding Plymouth Garrison from 1903 until that post was abolished.

Governors of Plymouth
1596–1601: Sir Ferdinando Gorges (removed from office, 1601)
1601–1602: Sir Nicholas Parker
1603–1629: Sir Ferdinando Gorges (restored to office)
1629–1638: James Bagge (jointly)
1638–1643: Sir Jacob Astley
1643: William Ruthven (Parliamentarian)
1644 (?): Col. William II Gould (1615-1644) of Floyer Hayes, Exeter, after whose tenure "Mount Gold" in Plymouth is named. He was buried at St Andrew's, Plymouth.
1645–1645: John Robartes, 2nd Baron Robartes
1645–?1659: Ralph Weldon (Parliamentarian)
1659–1659: John Desborough
1660–1661: Sir William Morice
1661–1696: John Granville, 1st Earl of Bath
1696–1722: Major General Charles Trelawny
1722–1745: Charles Churchill
1745–1752: John Murray, 2nd Earl of Dunmore
1752–1759: John Ligonier, 1st Viscount Ligonier
1759–1760: Richard Onslow
1760–1784: John Waldegrave, 3rd Earl Waldegrave
1784–1805: Lord George Lennox
1805–1807: John Pitt, 2nd Earl of Chatham
1807–1808: Gerard Lake, 1st Viscount Lake
1808–1814: William Howe, 5th Viscount Howe
1814–1819: Charles Lennox, 4th Duke of Richmond
1819–1826: Arthur Wellesley, 1st Duke of Wellington
1826–1830: William Harcourt, 3rd Earl Harcourt
1830–1842: Rowland Hill, 1st Baron Hill

Lieutenant-Governors of Plymouth
1746–1748: Lieutenant-General William Blakeney 
1748–1754: Major Chiverton Hartopp 
1754–1771: Lieutenant John Williams
1771–1782: Lieutenant-Colonel William Blackett
1782–1803: Colonel John Campbell
1803–1812: Major-General Richard England
1812–1819: Major-General Gore Browne
1819–1823: Major-General Sir Denis Pack
1823–1833: Major-General Sir John Cameron
1835–1840: Major-General Sir Willoughby Cotton
1840–1842: Major-General Robert Ellice
1842–1852: Major-General Sir Henry Murray
1853–1854: Major-General Sir Harry Smith
1855–1859: Major-General George Eden
1859–1865: Major-General William Hutchinson
1865–1866: Lieutenant-General Viscount Templetown
1866–1869: Lieutenant-General Sir Augustus Spencer
1869–1874: Major-General Sir Charles Staveley
1874–1877: Lieutenant-General Henry Smyth
1877–1880: Lieutenant-General the Hon. Leicester Smyth
1880–1883: Lieutenant-General Thomas Pakenham
1883–1885: Major-General James Sayer
1885–1889: Major-General Thomas Lyons
1889–1990: Major-General Sir Howard Elphinstone
1890–1895: General Sir Richard Harrison
1895–1899: Lieutenant-General Sir Frederick Forestier-Walker
1899–1905: Lieutenant-General Sir William Butler

References

Military of the United Kingdom
Plymouth